Megan L. Srinivas is an American politician and physician serving as a member of the Iowa House of Representatives for the 30th district. Elected in November 2022, she assumed office on January 1, 2023.

Early life and education 
Srinivas was born and raised in Fort Dodge, Iowa. After graduating from Fort Dodge Senior High School as her class's valedictorian, she earned a Bachelor of Arts degree in evolutionary biology from Harvard University. Srinivas earned a Doctor of Medicine from the Roy J. and Lucille A. Carver College of Medicine at the University of Iowa and a Master of Public Health from the Harvard T.H. Chan School of Public Health.

Career 
Srinivas completed an internal medicine residency at the Johns Hopkins School of Medicine and an infectious disease fellowship at the UNC School of Medicine. She remained at Chapel Hill as an infectious disease researcher and clinical instructor until 2022. Srinivas was elected to the Iowa House of Representatives in November 2022.

References 

Living people
American physicians
Physicians from Iowa
People from Fort Dodge, Iowa
People from Webster County, Iowa
Harvard University alumni
University of Iowa alumni
Harvard School of Public Health alumni

Iowa Democrats
Women state legislators in Iowa
Members of the Iowa House of Representatives
American infectious disease physicians
University of North Carolina School of Medicine faculty